Rock On TV was an arts and entertainment television channel broadcast in the United Kingdom, on the Sky platform. The channel launched on 1 October 2008 and it replaced Performance MainStreet when it closed down on 10 September 2008.

Rock On TV closed on 16 February 2009.

External links
Official site

Music video networks in the United Kingdom
Television channels in the United Kingdom
Television channels and stations established in 2008
Defunct television channels in the United Kingdom
Television channels and stations disestablished in 2009
2008 establishments in the United Kingdom